Streptomyces griseofuscus is a bacterium species from the genus of Streptomyces which has been isolated from soil in Japan. Streptomyces griseofuscus produces azinomycin A, azinomycin B, bundlin A, bundlin B, moldicidin A, physostigmine, fungichromin and pentamycin.

Further reading

See also 
 List of Streptomyces species

References

External links
Type strain of Streptomyces griseofuscus at BacDive -  the Bacterial Diversity Metadatabase

griseofuscus
Bacteria described in 1962